The 2005 Paris–Roubaix was the 103rd running of the Paris–Roubaix single-day cycling race, often known as the Hell of the North. These are the results for the 2005 edition of the Paris–Roubaix cycling classic, in which Tom Boonen entered history doing the double with his Tour of Flanders win. This edition was run under clear skies and relatively good weather.

In the previous Sunday's Tour of Flanders, Boonen launched a surprise attack on his adversaries, surprising those who expected him to wait until the finale to launch his sprint.  This time, Boonen patiently waited for the final group of three (with Hincapie and Flecha) to enter the velodrome together.  Then he easily outsprinted the other riders in the final lap.

Results 
10-04-2005: Compiègne–Roubaix, 259 km.

References

External links
Race website

2005
Paris–Roubaix
2005 in French sport
April 2005 sports events in France